Dunn School may refer to:

 Sir William Dunn School of Pathology, University of Oxford
 Dunn School, Los Olivos, a private boarding and day school for grades 6–12 located outside of Los Olivos, California